This is a list of theatres in Bristol, England. Listed spaces have been primarily used for theatre in the past or are in current use. Many other spaces in the city have hosted plays.

Early theatrical performances were associated with religious feasts such as Christmas and St Katherine's Day. Schoolboys from St Bartholomew's Hospital are recorded as having performed plays, probably classical drama, in the 16th century. Touring companies such as the Queen's Men, the Admiral's Men and the Lord Chamberlain's Men performed frequently at the guildhall during the 1580s and the 1590s. In the early 17th century, two private playhouses were opened, the Wine Street Playhouse and Redcliffe Hall. Drama historian Mark Pilkington considers this "a situation unique in the provinces." During the period of the Commonwealth (1642–1659) drama was suppressed and playhouses throughout England were closed. In the late 17th century a playhouse was erected in Tucker Street near Bristol Bridge, but there were complaints by clergy and residents and the theatre was closed in 1704 and converted into a Presbyterian meeting house.

In 1729, a new theatre was opened at Jacob's Well by an actor named John Hippisley, who had created the character of Peachum in the premiere of Gay's Beggar's Opera. Lying outside the then city limits, the theatre was safe from the magistrates and it remained in business until, in 1766, the Theatre Royal was opened in King Street. The Theatre Royal has remained in business almost continuously ever since and is claimed to be Britain's oldest working theatre. The New Theatre Royal, later renamed as the Prince's Theatre, was opened in 1867 on Park Row, with a larger stage and auditorium than the King Street premises. In the last decades of the 19th century and the early 20th century a number of music halls were opened but most became cinemas by the mid-20th century. Most Prominent of these is the Bristol Hippodrome, which opened in 1912, and which regularly hosts opera, West End Musicals, dance and variety.

Since the 1970s a number of arts centres and small venues have opened with regular visiting companies and amateur productions. Although funding cuts have led to the closure of venues such as the Albany Centre and the Hope Centre, other venues such as the Alma Tavern Theatre and the Tobacco Factory Theatre have taken their place.

List

See also
Culture in Bristol
List of theatres in the United Kingdom

Works cited

References

 
Bristol
Theatres in Bristol